Dorcadion investitum is a species of beetle in the family Cerambycidae. It was described by Stephan von Breuning in 1970. It is known from Turkey.

References

investitum
Beetles described in 1970